The 1951 Soviet Cup was an association football cup competition of the Soviet Union.

Competition schedule

First round
 [Aug 12] 
 Inkaras Kaunas                   0-3  LOKOMOTIV Moskva              [aet] 
   [Viktor Stroke, Boris Pirogov, Suetin] 
 METALLURG Zaporozhye             1-0  Dinamo Minsk 
   [V.Oleinik 87] 
 SPARTAK Moskva                   3-1  DO Novosibirsk 
   [Nikita Simonyan 8, Viktor Terentyev 75, Alexei Paramonov 88 – A.Afanasyev 20] 
 [Aug 15] 
 Dinamo Frunze                    2-4  DO Tashkent                   [aet] 
   [Malyarenko, Karabajak – Kravchenko-3, Adamovich] 
 [Aug 16] 
 VVS-2 Moskva                     2-6  SPARTAK Uzhgorod              [aet]   
   [Bobrov-2 (1 pen) – Vanzel-2, Grubchak, Kesler, Nad, P.Kotov (V) og] 
 [Aug 22] 
 DINAMO Stalinabad                4-0  DO Stalinabad 
   [N.Shakirov, F.Rukavishnikov, Y.Kuzmin, B.Gachegov]

Second round
 [Aug 9] 
 SHAKHTYOR Stalino                3-2  Spartak Ashkhabad      [in Moskva] 
   [Viktor Kolesnikov, Dmitriy Ivanov, Viktor Fomin – I.Pavlidi, Borkin] 
 [Aug 11] 
 DO Riga                          1-0  Dinamo Alma-Ata 
   [Kapustin 88] 
 [Aug 12] 
 InFizKult Leningrad              0-1  TORPEDO Moskva                [aet] 
   [Vladimir Nechayev 98] 
 Krasnoye Znamya Kishinev         0-1  MVO Kalinin 
   [Alexandr Shcherbakov] 
 [Aug 13] 
 Dinamo-2 Alma-Ata                2-4  DINAMO Leningrad 
   [Volozhenko, Gilev – German Zonin, Vasiliy Lotkov, Vladimir Solovyov, Vladimir Tsvetkov] 
 [Aug 14] 
 DINAMO Yerevan                   2-1  Stroitel Leninakan            [aet] 
   [G.Karmiryan, Amazasp Mkhoyan – A.Boyajan] 
 [Aug 15] 
 DO Minsk                         1-2  VVS Moskva 
   [M.Vorobyov 20 pen – Karo Shirinyan 4, 7] 
 Lokomotiv Petrozavodsk           0-11 DINAMO Tbilisi 
   [Avtandil Gogoberidze-3, Andrei Zazroyev-2, Boris Paichadze-2, Avtandil Chkuaseli-2, Konstantin Gagnidze, Georgiy Antadze] 
 ZiB Baku                         0-4  LOKOMOTIV Kharkov 
   [Mikhail Solovyov-2, Anatoliy Gorokhov, Georgiy Borzenko] 
 [Aug 16] 
 KBF Tallinn                      3-0  Krasnaya Zvezda Petrozavodsk  
   [Y.Pevtsov 14, 47, 55] 
 [Aug 19] 
 METALLURG Zaporozhye             4-0  Lokomotiv Moskva 
   [Fedortsev-2 (1 pen), O.Kiknadze, V.Oleinik] 
 SPARTAK Moskva                   5-1  Spartak Uzhgorod 
   [Viktor Terentyev-2, Nikita Simonyan, Sergei Rudnev, Nikolai Dementyev - Fyodor Vanzel] 
 [Aug 21] 
 Lokomotiv Mary                   0-4  DO Tashkent          [in Ashkhabad] 
   [Adamovich-2, Kravchenko-2] 
 [Aug 30] 
 KRYLYA SOVETOV Tashkent          3-1  Dinamo Stalinabad 
   [A.Nikitin, V.Makarov, I.Malin – K.Shakirov] 
 TRUD Tbilisi                     w/o  Trudoviye Rezervy Frunze

Third round
 [Aug 12] 
 Neftyanik Baku                   0-2  DAUGAVA Riga 
   [Pyotr Katrovskiy-2] 
 [Aug 14] 
 KRASNOYE ZNAMYA Ivanovo          3-1  Burevestnik Kishinev 
   [N.Voronin, V.Fedichkin, Y.Zabrodin – N.Voronkov] 
 [Aug 16] 
 TORPEDO Gorkiy                   3-2  Spartak Tbilisi               [aet] 
   [Vladimir Nenastin ?, Vladimir Lazarev ?, Viktor Gorbunov 100 pen – Zaur Kaloyev 17, 89] 
 [Aug 18] 
 CDSA Moskva                      5-0  VMS Moskva 
   [Valentin Nikolayev-3, Alexei Grinin, Vyacheslav Solovyov] 
 [Aug 19] 
 Dinamo Leningrad                 0-1  MVO Kalinin 
   [Alexandr Shcherbakov 33] 
 DINAMO Yerevan                   2-1  DO Riga 
   [Arutyun Kegeyan, Ilya Mkrtchan – V.Kapustin] 
 Kalev Tallinn                    0-1  SPARTAK Vilnius 
   [Martinas Dauksa 80] 
 KRYLYA SOVETOV Kuibyshev         2-0  Torpedo Moskva 
   [Fyodor Novikov 7, Alexandr Gulevskiy ?] 
 [Aug 20] 
 VVS Moskva                       5-1  Dinamo Tbilisi 
   [Vasiliy Volkov 7, Sergei Korshunov 11, 25, Viktor Panyukov (D) 40 og, Viktor Fyodorov 88 – Konstantin Gagnidze 63] 
 [Aug 21] 
 Lokomotiv Kharkov                1-3  SHAKHTYOR Stalino 
   [Anatoliy Gorokhov – Leonid Savinov, Dmitriy Ivanov, Alexandr Ponomaryov] 
 [Aug 22] 
 TRUD Tbilisi                     4-0  KBF Tallinn 
   [Sh.Matrineshvili-2, O.Kuchaidze, M.Gabaladze] 
 [Sep 20] 
 Torpedo Stalingrad               0-2  ZENIT Leningrad 
   [Ivan Komarov 52, 83] 
 [Sep 22] 
 SPARTAK Moskva                   8-2  DO Tashkent 
   [Nikita Simonyan-3, Viktor Terentyev-2, Alexandr Obotov, Alexei Paramonov, Alexandr Rystsov – Sedov (S) og, Klimanov] 
 [Sep 26] 
 METALLURG Zaporozhye             9-2  Krylya Sovetov Tashkent 
   [P.Ponomaryov-5, B.Zozulya, V.Oleinik, S.Vasilyev, G.Sushko – Nikitin, Ahunjanov]

Fourth round
 [Aug 19] 
 DAUGAVA Riga                     3-2  Krasnoye Znamya Ivanovo 
   [Alfons Jegers, Hugo Prieditis, V.Fedin – M.Krainov, V.Strakhov] 
 [Aug 22] 
 CDSA Moskva                      4-3  Torpedo Gorkiy 
   [Vladimir Yelizarov 14, Vladimir Dyomin 24, Alexei Grinin ?, ? pen – Jesus Varela 46, Vladimir Nenastin ?, Yuriy Shebilov 80] 
 [Aug 25] 
 KRYLYA SOVETOV Kuibyshev         2-0  Spartak Vilnius         [in Moskva] 
   [Boris Smyslov, Viktor Voroshilov] 
 [Aug 27] 
 MVO Kalinin                      2-1  Dinamo Yerevan          [in Moskva] 
   [Alexandr Shcherbakov 9, Nikolai Yakovlev 60 – Armenak Durgaryan 44] 
 [Sep 20] 
 VVS Moskva                       3-1  Trud Tbilisi                  [aet] 
   [Vasiliy Volkov 84, Sergei Korshunov 114, 118 – V.Shakhnazarov 8] 
 [Sep 29] 
 Shakhtyor Stalino                1-1  Zenit Leningrad         [in Moskva] 
   [Vladimir Gavrilenko 28 – Friedrich Maryutin 55] 
 [Sep 30] 
 SPARTAK Moskva                   1-0  Dinamo Kiev 
   [Alexei Paramonov 66] 
 [Oct 1] 
 DINAMO Moskva                    5-1  Metallurg Zaporozhye 
   [Ivan Konov 27, 58, Sergei Salnikov 39, 59, Vasiliy Trofimov 62 – Zozulya 65]

Fourth round replays
 [Sep 30, Moskva] 
 SHAKHTYOR Stalino                3-1  Zenit Leningrad 
   [Viktor Kolesnikov 20, 42, Viktor Fomin 21 – Ivan Komarov 32]

Quarterfinals
 [Oct 2] 
 CDSA Moskva                      1-1  Krylya Sovetov Kuibyshev 
   [Vladimir Yelizarov ? – Viktor Voroshilov 50 pen] 
 [Oct 3] 
 SHAKHTYOR Stalino                2-1  Daugava Riga            [in Moskva] 
   [Alexandr Ponomaryov, Dmitriy Ivanov – Pyotr Katrovskiy] 
 [Oct 4] 
 VVS Moskva                       3-2  Spartak Moskva                [aet] 
   [Sergei Korshunov 2, 101, Vasiliy Volkov 103 – Alexei Paramonov 30, Igor Netto 107] 
 [Oct 5] 
 Dinamo Moskva                    1-4  MVO Kalinin 
   [Alexandr Sokolov 83 – Anatoliy Akimov 28, 87, Vladimir Dobrikov 64, Alexandr Shcherbakov 85]

Quarterfinals replays
 [Oct 3] 
 CDSA Moskva                      4-1  Krylya Sovetov Kuibyshev 
   [Alexei Grinin-2, Boris Koverznev, Vladimir Dyomin – Viktor Voroshilov]

Semifinals
 [Oct 8] 
 CDSA Moskva                      1-0  VVS Moskva 
   [Yevgeniy Rogov (V) 15 og] 
 [Oct 9] 
 MVO Kalinin                      1-0  Shakhtyor Stalino       [in Moskva] 
   [Vladimir Dobrikov 42]

Final

 Note: the game was annulled.

Replay

External links
 Complete calendar. helmsoccer.narod.ru
 1951 Soviet Cup. Footballfacts.ru
 1951 Soviet football season. RSSSF

Soviet Cup seasons
Cup
Soviet Cup
Soviet Cup